Radek Bělohlav (born 11 April 1970) is a Czech former professional ice hockey player, and a current coach. He played with HC Kladno in the Czech Extraliga during the 2010–11 Czech Extraliga season.

References

External links

1970 births
Czech ice hockey forwards
Czech ice hockey coaches
Rytíři Kladno players
Motor České Budějovice players
HC Sparta Praha players
VHK Vsetín players
Living people
Sportspeople from České Budějovice
Czechoslovak ice hockey forwards